Rafael Guastavino Moreno (March 1, 1842 February 1, 1908) was a Spanish building engineer and builder who immigrated to the United States in 1881; his career for the next three decades was based in New York City.

Based on the Catalan vault, he created the Guastavino tile, a "Tile Arch System", patented in the United States in 1885, which was used for constructing robust, self-supporting arches and architectural vaults using interlocking terracotta tiles and layers of mortar. His work appears in numerous prominent projects designed by major architectural firms in New York and other cities of the Northeast. Guastavino tile is found in some of New York's most prominent Beaux-Arts landmarks and in major buildings across the United States. It is also used in numerous architecturally important and famous buildings with vaulted spaces.

Guastavino Fireproof Construction Company

In 1881 Guastavino came to New York City from Valencia, with his youngest son, nine-year-old Rafael III. In Spain he had been an accomplished architect and was a contemporary of Antoni Gaudí. In the March 7, 1885 article entitled "The Dakota Apartment House", printed in The Real Estate Record and Builders Guide, Guastavino was identified as the contractor in charge of "fireproof construction" of the luxury apartment building, which was completed in 1884. Though not specified, the work may very well have included the groined vault entries on the south side on West 72nd Street, and the north side on West 73rd Street, as well as the construction of the subterranean basement, and the 3-foot thick arched floors between the basement and attic levels.

Guastavino was commissioned by the firm of McKim, Mead, and White for their Boston Public Library (1889), which increased his reputation with every major architect on the East Coast. His published drawings of interior decoration of the Spanish Renaissance style caught the eye of an architect, who asked him to submit a design for the planned New York Progress Club building. After forming a partnership with William Blodgett, Guastavino eventually was offered a construction position in 1890 with George W. Vanderbilt to construct arches for the new mansion, Biltmore Estate at Asheville, North Carolina.

After working on the estate, Guastavino decided to build his own retirement home in the mountains of Black Mountain, North Carolina in a 500-acre valley. His property, Rhododendron, also had a vineyard, dairy, brick kiln, and more. This property currently is owned by Christmount Assembly, the conference center for the Christian Church (Disciples of Christ). The property holds artifacts that may be visited, including the kiln and chimney, a wine cellar, beautiful old stone walls, and many smaller structures that have been rediscovered as modern buildings have been constructed there.

Guastavino and his son also developed twenty-four products that were awarded patents. Their company, Guastavino Fireproof Construction Company, run by the father and then by his son, was incorporated in 1889. It executed its final contract in 1962. Akoustolith was one of several trade names used by Guastavino.

Hundreds of major building projects incorporate the distinctive Tile Arch System. In Chicago, the central nave vaulting of Rockefeller Chapel at the University of Chicago uses 100,000 Guastavino tiles. In Boston, Guastavino tiles are found in the Boston Public Library; in New York City, in the Grand Central Terminal, Grant's Tomb, Carnegie Hall, the American Museum of Natural History, Congregation Emanu-El of New York, and St. Bartolomew's Episcopal Church; and in Washington, D.C. in the U.S. Supreme Court building and the National Museum of Natural History on the National Mall. Guastavino tiles form the domes of Philadelphia's St. Francis de Sales Roman Catholic Church. At Pittsburgh's Union Station, the vaulting of the carriage turnaround is a Guastavino tile system. In Nebraska, the tiles may be seen in the Nebraska State Capitol.

Work in New York City

In 1900, New York architects Heins & LaFarge hired Guastavino to help construct City Hall station, the underground showpiece for the IRT, the first part of the then-new New York City Subway. The station, although elegant, was never convenient or popular, as it was superseded by nearby stops with connections to Brooklyn. After the city closed it in 1945 because needed upgrades were too expensive, it became a legendary abandoned Manhattan underground relic. Subway buffs and urban spelunkers knew about it. Guastavino also installed the ceiling of the south arcade of the Manhattan Municipal Building, which was constructed during 1907-1914.

The Guastavinos had entered New York as immigrants via Ellis Island. In 1917 the younger Rafael Guastavino III was commissioned to rebuild the ceiling of the Ellis Island Great Hall. The Guastavinos set 28,832 tiles into a self-supporting interlocking -high ceiling grid so durable and strong that during the restoration project of the 1980s, as many sources repeat, only seventeen of those tiles needed replacing.

This dome was intended to be a temporary structure, to be replaced by a high central tower. In 2009 this "temporary" fix celebrated the 100th anniversary of its construction. Guastavino received this contract due to the much lower price he could quote because his system served as its own scaffolding. This was an extreme test of his system, however. The masons had to work from above, each day adding a few rows of tiles, and standing on the previous day's work to make progress. At the edges, many layers of tile were laid, and the dome thins as it rises toward the center.

As building engineer
Few structures designed and built by Guastavino alone have been identified. He was responsible for a series of surviving rowhouses with unusual Mooresque features on West 78th Street (121–131 known as the "red and whites"), on Manhattan's Upper West Side. Another of his structures, now used as an event space called Guastavino's, is located under the Midtown Manhattan end of the Queensboro Bridge. His son Rafael's Mediterranean villa (1912), built entirely of Guastavino tiles, still stands on Awixa Avenue, in Bay Shore, Long Island and was added to the National Register of Historic Places in 2013.

Retirement in North Carolina

After working on a commission at the Biltmore Estate, Guastavino retired to Black Mountain.

The site of his estate is now used as Christmount, the conference and retreat center of the Christian Church (Disciples of Christ). Ruins of the original Guastavino Estate still stand, and a collection of Guastavino memorabilia is held in the Christmount library. The Rafael Guastavino, Sr., Estate was listed on the National Register of Historic Places in 1989.

In North Carolina Guastavino completed a number of projects: his work is found in Duke Chapel in Durham, the Jefferson Standard Building in Greensboro, the Motley Memorial in Chapel Hill, and Basilica Shrine of St. Mary in Wilmington. He is buried in the crypt of the Basilica of St. Lawrence, Asheville, which he designed in 1905.

Archival sources
The records and drawings of the Guastavino Fireproof Construction Company are held by the Department of Drawings & Archives in the Avery Architectural and Fine Arts Library at Columbia University in New York City.

See also 
First Church of Christ, Scientist (Cambridge, Massachusetts)

References
Notes

Further reading
 Ochsendorf, John; Freeman, Michael (Photographer), Guastavino Vaulting: The Art of Structural Tile, Princeton Architectural Press; 1st edition (September 22, 2010). 

 Moro, Javier; A prueba de fuego, Ed. Planeta 2020, a novel thoroughly researched about the Guastavinos, father and son. ISBN: 978-84-670-6391-2

External links

Rafaelguastavino.com: documenting Guastavino's work in New York City
Guastavino.net backup at MIT: documenting Guastavino's work in the Boston area, this page provides copies of writings and patents by the Guastavinos as well
 Video of masons using traditional Guastavino methods, ca.2012
 Guastavino Fireproof Construction Company architectural records, 1866-1985 (bulk, 1890-1942). Held by the Department of Drawings & Archives, Avery Architectural & Fine Arts Library, Columbia University, New York City

1842 births
1908 deaths
Burials in North Carolina
Businesspeople from New York City
Spanish Roman Catholics
Architects from the Valencian Community
19th-century American businesspeople